Raw as Fuck is an album by the British electronic music group Freestylers. Released in July 2004, it was the group's third album. It is also the first full-length album release from the Against the Grain label. The remix album was released almost a year later.

The album included breakbeat dance music, with tracks including the singles "Get a Life", "Push Up" and "Boom Blast". "Push Up" was particularly successful in Australia as a single, where it reached No. 2 in the charts, although in both Australia and the United Kingdom the album failed to make a major impact on the album charts.

The tracks "Punks", "The Slammer" and "No Replica" were originally from the singles the Freestylers created as Raw As Fuck in 2002–2003. The three singles were their first ever productions in Against the Grain.

Despite the album's title, the album did not carry a "Parental Advisory – Explicit Content" warning due to a lack of substantial profanity on the tracks themselves.

Track listing

Track 5 was originally from "The Slammer" / "Theme from Raw" single by Raw as F**k
Track 7 was originally from the "Punks" / "Demon Beats" single by Raw as F**k
Track 11 was originally credited as Million Dan vs. Raw as F**k
The duration of tracks 6 & 11 are extended in US releases.

Charts

References

Freestylers albums
2004 albums